Peter Krieger (30 November 1929 – 1981) was a German footballer who played for 1. FC Saarbrücken and the Saarland national team as a forward.

References

1929 births
1981 deaths
German footballers
Saar footballers
Saarland international footballers
1. FC Saarbrücken players
Association football forwards
People from Göppingen (district)
Sportspeople from Stuttgart (region)
Footballers from Baden-Württemberg
VfB Stuttgart players
West German footballers